Gramella aestuarii is a Gram-negative and strictly aerobic bacterium from the genus of Gramella which has been isolated from tidal flat from Boseong in Korea.

References

Flavobacteria
Bacteria described in 2013